The Indian cricket team toured the West Indies from 4 June to 10 July 2011. The tour  consisted of one Twenty20 (T20), five One Day Internationals (ODIs) and three Tests.


Squads

T20I series

Only T20I

ODI series

1st ODI

2nd ODI

3rd ODI

4th ODI

5th ODI

Test series

1st Test

2nd Test

3rd Test

References

External links
 Tour home at ESPN Cricinfo

2011 in Indian cricket
2011 in West Indian cricket
2011
International cricket competitions in 2011
West Indian cricket seasons from 2000–01